Mary Marshall may refer to:
 Mary Magdalene Marshall, hotelier and philanthropist 
 Mary Paley Marshall, economist
 Mary A. R. Marshall, member of the Virginia House of Delegates
 Mary Louise Marshall, librarian and professor of medical bibliography
 Mary Adamson Anderson Marshall, physician and a member of the Edinburgh Seven
 Mary Marshall Dyer, née Marshall, voice for the anti-Shakerism sentiment in rural New Hampshire
 Mary Marshall, stage name of Mary Grace Borel, American socialite and film actress